Asthenochloa is a monotypic genus of Southeast Asian plants in the grass family. The only known species is Asthenochloa tenera, native to Philippines, Sulawesi, Java, and the Lesser Sunda Islands.

See also
 List of Poaceae genera

References

Andropogoneae
Monotypic Poaceae genera
Flora of Malesia